"Ameno" is a song by French new-age musical project Era (stylized as +eRa+). It was released in June 1996 as a single from their self-titled debut album Era and became a chart success in France, Belgium, Sweden, Switzerland, Poland and Latin America.

Background
"Ameno" was written by new-age artist Eric Lévi. The lyrics, by Guy Protheroe, are written in Pseudo-Latin, i.e. sounding like Latin but are in fact deliberately devoid of any exact meaning. The vocals are performed by Guy Protheroe and Harriet Jay. Eric Lévi played keyboards and programmed it, whereas Philippe Manca played lead guitar, bass and drums. The choir rendition is by The English Chamber Choir.

Music video
A music video for "Ameno" was shot for the song featuring actors Léonore Confino (sword girl) (version 1), Iréne Bustamante, and Pierre Boisserie (version 2). The music video, set in medieval times, shows three children who go on an excursion to Montségur. The girl sees a monument and when she touches it, she seems to have memories of a past life. In her vision, a girl (perhaps herself) is seen with a group of children and an eagle on her arm. They are apparently homeless and looking for a place to camp; the place that they choose is the same monument from the beginning of the video. Almost simultaneously, a knight goes to the same place and when he arrives, he tries to behead the monument with his sword, but is unsuccessful. The sword falls near the girl who manages to break the monument. Inside, there is a medallion in the shape of a cross. The girl from the beginning of the video reappears and is wearing the same medallion.

Charts

Weekly charts

Year-end charts

Certifications

Other versions
The song has been interpreted many times and is very popular in covers and parodies. 
Famous versions include DJ Quicksilver (2000), Roberto Molinaro techno mix version in Italy (2005) and French tenor Vincent Niclo interpretation with the Red Army Choir (2012).

DJ Quicksilver version

A remix of "Ameno" was made by Turkish-German DJ and music producer DJ Quicksilver. It appeared in the Clubfiles - The Album by DJ Quicksilver and was a hit for him in a number of countries including singles charts in Austria, Belgium (Wallonia French charts), Germany, the Netherlands, and Switzerland. It was produced by Tommaso De Donatis and by Orhan Terzi (actually DJ  Quicksilver himself using his real name).

Track lists

CD maxi (Polydor)
"Ameno
"Ameno" (club mix) (6:20)
"Ameno" (C.J. Stone remix) (6:22)
"Voyage" (6:10)

CD maxi (ADN Progressive)
"Ameno" (radio edit) (3:28)
"Ameno" (video mix) (3:00)
"Ameno" (club mix) (7:30)
"Ameno" (De Donatis mix) (8:14)
"Ameno" (C.J. Stone remix) (7:39)
"Ameno" (Analog masters remix) (6:01)
"Ameno" (OG Sterling Amapiano remix) (3:41)

Charts

Vincent Niclo & Les Chœurs de l'Armée Rouge version

French tenor Vincent Niclo recorded the song accompanied by the MVD Ensemble (widely known as Red Army Choir or in French as credited in the recording, "Les Chœurs de l'Armée Rouge").
 
The song appeared on his album Opéra rouge and was released as a single in France reaching #87 in SNEP, the official French Singles Chart.

Charts

Ameno Amapiano Remix 

A cover known as "Ameno Amapiano Remix" was made by Ghanaian music producer, Nektunez who paired Nigerian Singer, Goya Menor. It charted at number 1 on the billboard music chart. It was released on 16 June 2021. Goya Menor was inspired to remix the original while listening to the song in a night club. The song was sung and rapped by Menor while Nektunez served as the producer and song writer. "Ameno Amapiano Remix" became popular in late 2021 and was commonly used in night clubs to announce when expensive drinks are purchased. It also gained popularity on the social networking site, TikTok and was used in over half a million videos and responsible for the internet slang, "You want to bambam". It is regarded as the anthem of Detty December. Menor performed the song at the Livespot X Festival by Tiwa Savage.

In popular media 
The use of the song in YouTube videos and Twitch streams has led to its popularisation as an internet meme, with a resurgence in popularity as a TikTok meme in early 2020. It also has been utilized by Napoli fans as a tribute song to association football player Victor Osimhen and his contribution to the team's successful results in the 2022–23 Serie A season.

References

Internet memes
Internet memes introduced in 2020

https://audiomack.com/ogsterling/song/ameno-amapiano